360 was an Xbox 360 video games magazine published by Imagine Publishing in the UK. Originally published four-weekly, the magazine switched to a three-weekly schedule in 2009.

The magazine was withdrawn from sale following its merger with sister publication X360 in July 2012.

Overview 
The magazine was split into four main sections: Agenda, Foreplay, Reviews, and Live Style. The double page spread on pages eight and nine, called Thread, was composed of emails, letters and posts or sections of posts from the 360 magazine forum. On page nine, there was a pie chart showing votes cast on the 360 magazine forum on a different subject every week, which was chosen by the magazine staff. There were also two features following the Reviews section that sometimes were as long as ten pages. As a standard, the magazine was 130 pages long.

Merger with X360 
On 7 June 2012, Imagine announced to 360's forum that 360 and its sister publication, X360, were to merge under the latter's name. As a result, 360 was to be withdrawn from sale, with no further issues published.

The first issue of the new X360 went on sale on 11 July 2012.

References

External links 
 

2005 establishments in the United Kingdom
2012 disestablishments in the United Kingdom
Defunct computer magazines published in the United Kingdom
Magazines established in 2005
Magazines disestablished in 2012
Video game magazines published in the United Kingdom
Xbox magazines
Xbox 360